Chlorobenzaldehyde may refer to:

 2-Chlorobenzaldehyde (o-chlorobenzaldehyde)
 3-Chlorobenzaldehyde (m-chlorobenzaldehyde)
 4-Chlorobenzaldehyde (p-chlorobenzaldehyde)